The northern dwarf skink  (Nannoscincus exos) is a species of skink found in New Caledonia.

References

Nannoscincus
Reptiles described in 2000
Skinks of New Caledonia
Endemic fauna of New Caledonia
Taxa named by Aaron M. Bauer
Taxa named by Ross Allen Sadlier